Narman, formerly Namervan and İd, is a town and district of Erzurum Province in the Eastern Anatolia region of Turkey. The mayor is Burhanettin Eser (AKP). The population is 4,989 (as of 2010).

References

External links
 Narman

Erzurum
Towns in Turkey
Populated places in Erzurum Province
Districts of Erzurum Province